The Goose Girl is a 1957 West German family film directed by Fritz Genschow and starring Rita-Maria Nowotny, Renée Stobrawa and Renate Fischer. It is based on the fairy tale The Goose Girl by the Brothers Grimm.

Cast
 Rita-Maria Nowotny as Prinzessin Rosemargret
 Renée Stobrawa as Königin-Mutter
 Renate Fischer as Malice - Kammermädchen
 Günter Hertel as Prinz Friedbert
 Alexander Welbat as Hinz - Reitbursche
 Wolfgang Draeger as Kunz - Reitbursche
 Fritz Genschow
 Theodor Vogeler
 Peter Hack

References

Bibliography 
 Jack Zipes. The Enchanted Screen: The Unknown History of Fairy-Tale Films. Routledge, 2011.

External links 
 

1957 films
West German films
1950s German-language films
Films directed by Fritz Genschow
Films based on Grimms' Fairy Tales
German children's fantasy films
1950s children's fantasy films
Films based on fairy tales
1950s German films